The Simcoe Stakes is a Canadian Thoroughbred horse race run annually at Woodbine Racetrack in Toronto, Ontario. The race is restricted to Canadian foaled two-year-old colts and geldings sold through the Canadian Thoroughbred Horse Society (CTHS) Ontario yearling sale.

History

Records
Speed record:
 1:17.90 @ 6.5 furlongs: Dragon's Brew (2020)
 1:23.09 @ 7 furlongs: Invitation Only (2010)

Most wins by a jockey:
 7 - David K. Clark (1982, 1984, 1987, 1998, 2001, 2003, 2005)

Most wins by a trainer:
 6 - Jerry C. Meyer (1962, 1966, 1967, 1969, 1970, 1985)

Most wins by an owner:
 3 - Willow Downs Farm (Saul Wagman) (1966, 1967, 1970)

Winners

References

Restricted stakes races in Canada
Recurring sporting events established in 1953
Flat horse races for two-year-olds
Open sprint category horse races
Open mile category horse races
Fort Erie Race Track
Woodbine Racetrack